IRF may refer to:

General
Impulse response function
Information Retrieval Facility
Initial Reaction Force or Internal Response Force
Immediate Response Force
Institute of Space Physics (Sweden), (Institutet för rymdfysik)
Interferon Regulatory Factor (e.g. IRF6)
International Rectifier, New York Stock Exchange symbol IRF

Foundations/organizations
International Ranger Federation
International Rabbinic Fellowship
International Rogaining Federation
Islamic Research Foundation
International Rafting Federation
International Ringette Federation

Computing
Intelligent Resilient Framework, Virtual Switch Chassis Aggregation